ISTR may refer to:

IstR RNA, a family of non-coding RNA
The International Society for Third-Sector Research